CNNNN (Chaser NoN-stop News Network) is a Logie Award winning Australian television program, satirising American news channels CNN and Fox News. It was produced and hosted by comedy team The Chaser.

CNNNN'''s slogan was "We Report, You Believe.", a parody of Fox News' slogan "We Report, You Decide."

In April 2004, CNNNN won a Logie Award for Most Outstanding Comedy Program, an award that was shared with Kath & Kim.

Overview
The program was presented as a "live" feed from a fictional 24-hour news channel, anchored by Craig Reucassel and Chris Taylor. Each episode had a theme which carried through the episode, examples (from the DVD) included:

Lunchgate: A businessman accidentally leaves his lunch at home and is pursued by police and the media in an O. J. Simpson style chase and becomes a suspected terrorist.
Cadman for PM: CNNNN beats up a comment by minor Australian politician Alan Cadman as a leadership challenge against Prime Minister John Howard.
Shush For Bush: US President George W. Bush is visiting Australia for 20 hours, and is believed to want to sleep the entire visit. CNNNN exhorts Australia to be quiet so the President can sleep properly.
Animal Farm: The Chaser "reality show" Animal Farm is a send-up of Big Brother. CNNNN covers the controversy when one of the contestants dies, but is not removed from the house.
Packer Health Crisis: Live updates on the health of Australian businessman Kerry Packer.
Tilt Australia: CNNNN aims to reduce the water-shortage crisis in inland Australia by tilting the entire continent to drain the water from the Eastern seaboard. Radio announcer Alan Jones was duped by the Chaser team live on air for believing this concept.

Season 1 

Season 2 

Cast members
The roles of other members of the Chaser team included:
 Charles Firth: played a hard-hitting reporter with highly-controversial opinions presented in segments called The Firth Factor, The Firth Report and Firth and Friends in which he abuses his guests, doing such things as gagging them and yelling in their face. The character could be interpreted as a parody of Bill O'Reilly, who hosts a program on Fox News Channel called the O'Reilly Factor, as well as Fox and Friends. An example of his hard hitting style, "100% of kids who smoke and have their brain removed, end up DEAD!"
 Andrew Hansen: the leader of the CNNNN "newsband", which would play musical commentary for some stories, and occasionally lyrically interact with the other members of the cast as if actually talking to them. He was also Rudi J Blass, the director of Newstainment, who would create game shows and entertainment pieces based around big news stories: "They say comedy equals tragedy plus time, well I say game show equals tragedy plus now'." Rudi J Blass often appeared in a studio very similar to that of Larry King Live and would commentate on news stories. Hansen was also Simon Target, a reporter with a thick English accent. In season one, the show started at the end of one of Simon Target's reports.
 Julian Morrow: CNNNN's US correspondent. Morrow would appear on a television as if he were overseas, although he did actually conduct a number of vox pops in the US to highlight American ignorance of Australia, other countries and international affairs in general. He would, amusingly, still speak about stories with no relevance to the US and sit as if he were actually on the news desk, and when the anchors would look at the screen on the other side of the room at other out-of-studio guests, Julian Morrow would do the same. In one episode he actually comes out of the television into the studio after Chris Taylor turns the screen he appears on off.
 Chas Licciardello: hosted Lameass, a parody of MTV's Jackass, with intentionally bad stunts. He also appeared as "Mongoose" in the Sky Chaser 8 news helicopter, as the producer of a new game show (allegedly meant to be "The Block" as a musical) and as a reporter of his own name, occasionally. In the first season, he was CNNNN's Brussels correspondent and whenever the anchors would cross to Brussels, a "technical problem", like Chas having a python wrapped around him or his severed head on the desk in front of him, would cut Chas off before he could even say anything, leading Reucassel to say, "Sorry, we seem to have a technical problem there in Brussels."
 Dominic Knight: former weatherman, now a reporter.
 Anna Skellern: correspondent.

Regular features
Other regular features of the program included:
 A newsbar, which proved so popular it was made available on the CNNNN website.
 Market Research conducted by Julian Morrow in the United States, in which he asks civilians questions on topics such as which country America should invade next, and prompts the civilians to choose their answer from exclusively right-wing multiple choice options.
 Advertisements for Fungry's, a multinational fast food outlet with a yellow cow mascot (slogan: "I'm fungry!") Sell Massive Meat Burger (triple deck beef patties topped with mincemeat and salad), Bacon Shake and offal pie as well as Massive Meat Burger Tartare (Massive Meat Burger served raw) during Meatlovers Month, Big Breakfast in a Bun (three eggs, bacon rashers, hash brown, pancakes, a French croissant and porridge, once with coffee), Peking Burger (all-beef patty, prawn chips and Chinese sauce), the Chinese buffet, Pickle Burger (two pickles on a gherkin patty with pickle sauce), the Pickle Tower Burger (five pickles on a sesame seed bun), pickle fries and pickle thick shake.
 Advertisements for Boggs Lager, an irresponsible beer company which promoted heavy drinking and even frequently marketed alcoholic products with: "The strength of fifty-four beers in a single glass" (slogan: "[Let's all] Get Boggered tonight!").
 A Chaser Affair, a parody of current affairs shows Today Tonight and A Current Affair Rita + Lin: The Hyper Twins, a parody of The Powerpuff Girls. Each promo would feature a different villain, such as 'The Communist ABC' and 'The Powerful Aborigines'.
 Advertisements for Esteem cosmetics, whose vague advertising parodied the deliberately confusing manner in which cosmetics are marketed (slogan: "Esteem – because you need it"). Esteem advertisements had a penchant for spurious statistical claims ("an astonishing Impact Factor of 8", "85% more proven", "200% more European" "95% more womanly") and bizarre product descriptions ("Beautelligence", "Scien-suality").
 Advertisements for Lameass, a parody of the American TV series Jackass.

Legacy
A DVD containing five of the episodes from the 2003 series of CNNNN (Lunchgate, Cadman for PM, Shush for Bush, Animal Farm, and Packer Health Crisis), as well as highlights from the fake advertising breaks, was released in November 2004.

In September 2005, Chaser News Alert started running on the ABC's digital TV station ABC2, shown every Thursday night at 7:55 pm. Chaser News Alerts are also shown on the ABC's Broadband website.

After CNNNN, The Chaser went to its next project The Chaser's War on Everything, which premiered on 17 February 2006 and featured similarly topical comedy to CNNNN.CNNNN previously aired repeats on 7mate. The episodes retained their original endings with the ABC logo.

See also

 The Chaser
 List of Australian television series
 List of Australian Broadcasting Corporation programs
 CNN
 Fox News
 Onion News Network, similar program from the US
 The Day Today, similar earlier program from the UK
 Talking to Americans The Daily Show Newstopia Rick Mercer Report This Hour Has 22 Minutes The Beaverton Hot Seat Real Time with Bill Maher''

References

External links
CNNNN Official Website

CNNNN at the National Film and Sound Archive.

Australian Broadcasting Corporation original programming
Australian comedy television series
The Chaser
Logie Award for Most Outstanding Comedy Program winners
News parodies
Australian satirical television shows
Self-reflexive television
Television series about television
Television series about journalism
2002 Australian television series debuts
2003 Australian television series endings
Television series by Fremantle (company)